Fundación Global Democracia y Desarrollo (FUNGLODE) is a non-profit organization founded by Dr. Leonel Fernández, ex-President of the Dominican Republic. FUNGLODE has a sister institution called Global Foundation for Democracy and Development (GFDD). FUNGLODE has offices in Santo Domingo.

Development organizations
Political organizations based in North America
Organizations based in the Dominican Republic
es:Fundación Global Democracia y Desarrollo